High Island or Leung Shuen Wan Chau is a former island located in the southeast of Sai Kung Peninsula in Hong Kong, within Sai Kung District. Two dams constructed between 1969 and 1979 and crossing the former Kwun Mun Channel, connect the island to the peninsula, thereby forming the High Island Reservoir. Before being connected to the mainland, the island had an area of 8.511 km² (3.29 square miles) and was the 4th largest island of Hong Kong in 1960.

Etymology
Geologically, high islands are islands of volcanic origin. The term can be used to distinguish such islands from low islands, which are formed from sedimentation or the uplifting of coral reefs (which have often formed on sunken volcanos).

Geography
High Island is located in the southeast of Sai Kung Peninsula, east of Port Shelter, Kau Sai Chau, Jin Island, Tai Tau Chau, and Bay Islet, north of Town Island, Bluff Island, Basalt Island, Wang Chau, Wong Nai Chau, and Kong Tau Pai, as well as west of Po Pin Chau and Conic Island.

The body of water to the southwest of the former island is called Rocky Harbour (or Leung Shuen Wan Hoi).

Villages
Villages and former villages on High Island include, from west to east along the south coast: Tai She Wan, Pak A, Sha Kiu, Tung A and Pak Lap.

Pak A, Tung A, Pak Lap and Tai She Wan are recognised villages under the New Territories Small House Policy.

Pak Lap was historically is a single (Lau) surname Hakka village. It contains 17 houses built in two rows. These houses have been restored and developed into a small resort.

Population
At the time of the 1911 census, the population of Pak A was 164. The number of males was 76.

In 2006, a few dozen people lived in Pak A, Tung A, Sha Kiu and Pak Lap. Additionally, about 100 people lived in designated fish culture zones.

Geology
High Island features columnar-jointed volcanic tuff. Most of the columns are sub-vertical, straight-sided and parallel. This type of volcanic rock covers a large area around Sai Kung Peninsula in the eastern part of Hong Kong, including High Island Reservoir and Tai Long Wan.

Features

Aquaculture
The water body near Leung Shuen Wan is one of the 26 designated marine fish culture zones in Hong Kong and its shores feature several seafood restaurants.

Tin Hau Temple
There is a Tin Hau Temple on High Island, located between Pak A and Tung A. Built in 1741, it is one of the two temples which have a marine parade to celebrate the Tin Hau Festival. The other is the Tin Hau Temple in Tap Mun which has it once every ten years. The Tin Hau Festival at High Island takes place every two years. The religious ceremony lasts six days and the marine parade is held on the eve of Tin Hau's birthday. Other deities including Kwan Tai and Kwun Yam are also worshipped at the temple. The temple was listed as a Grade II historic building in 1996, and as a Grade III historic building since 2010.

Refugee camp
The High Island Detention Centre was a refugee camp built near West Dam of the reservoir for hosting refugees and boat people from Vietnam. The area is now a flat piece of grassland that is grazed by cows. It has a pavilion that leads out of the strip of land.

Education
Leung Shuen Wan is in Primary One Admission (POA) School Net 95. Within the school net are multiple aided schools (operated independently but funded with government money) and one government school: Tseung Kwan O Government Primary School (將軍澳官立小學).

Conservation
High Island is part of the Sai Kung East Country Park. The eastern part of High Island is part of the Sai Kung Volcanic Rock Region of the Hong Kong Geopark.

The High Island Special Area covers 3.9 hectares and was designated in 2011. It includes the two islands Po Pin Chau and Conic Island and no part of High Island proper. The geology of the area is characterised by volcanic rocks of the Cretaceous period.

Transport
There are public piers in Pak A, Tung A and Sha Kiu, but there is no public ferry service to High Island. Sai Kung Man Yee Road runs through the northern part of High Island, roughly along High Island Reservoir, from West Dam to East Dam. The 9A minibus route is the only public transportation that can reach the East Dam of the High Island Reservoir, meanwhile urban taxis and new territories taxis are also allowed in Sai Kung Man Yee Road.

See also
 Historic churches of Sai Kung
 Hong Kong National Geopark

References

External links

 Delineation of area of existing village Pak A (Sai Kung) for election of resident representative (2019 to 2022)
 Delineation of area of existing village Pak Lap (Sai Kung) for election of resident representative (2019 to 2022)
 Delineation of area of existing village Tai She Wan (Sai Kung) for election of resident representative (2019 to 2022)
 Delineation of area of existing village Tung A (Sai Kung) for election of resident representative (2019 to 2022) (includes Sha Kiu)
 High Island: Internationally rare acidic polygonal volcanic rock columns
 Historical images of the Kwun Mun Channel: 
 Antiquities Advisory Board. Pictures of Tin Hau Temple, Leung Shuen Wan

Hong Kong UNESCO Global Geopark
Islands of Hong Kong
Sai Kung Peninsula